Boluwaduro is a Local Government Area in Osun State, Nigeria. Its headquarters is in the town of Otan Aiyegbaju (or Otan for short) at. It was created in October 1996 under late Gen. Abacha's regime.

It has an area of 144 km and a population of 70,775 at the 2006 census.

The postal code of the area is 231.

References

Local Government Areas in Osun State